Wrong Peak is a  summit in British Columbia, Canada.

Description

Wrong Peak is located in the Battle Range of the Selkirk Mountains. Precipitation runoff from the mountain drains north to Houston Creek and south to Westfall River, which are both tributaries of the Duncan River. Wrong Peak is more notable for its steep rise above local terrain than for its absolute elevation.

History
The first ascent of the summit was made in 1959 by Samuel Silverstein and party.

The peak was named in 1962 in association with the Wrong Glacier. The glacier is so named because a food cache was mistakenly air dropped here instead of the intended destination, Houston Glacier, which is five kilometers further northwest. The mountain's toponym was officially adopted on September 14, 1967, by the Geographical Names Board of Canada.

Climate

Based on the Köppen climate classification, Wrong Peak is located in a subarctic climate zone with cold, snowy winters, and mild summers. Winter temperatures can drop below −20 °C with wind chill factors below −30 °C. This climate supports the Wrong Glacier on the north slope of the peak and a small unnamed glacier on the east slope.

See also
Geography of British Columbia

References

External links
 Wrong Peak: Weather forecast

Two-thousanders of British Columbia
Selkirk Mountains
Kootenay Land District